The West Branch Sheepscot River is a  river in Maine.  The branch originates in the northwest corner of Palermo and flows southwesterly through Branch Pond and the village of Weeks Mills in the town of China.  The branch then flows southerly through the town of Windsor to a confluence with the Sheepscot River between Coopers Mills and North Whitefield.  The branch is bridged by Maine State Route 3 between Branch Pond and Weeks Mills, by Maine State Route 105 at Windsor and by concurrent Maine State Routes 17 and 32 near Coopers Mills.

See also
List of rivers of Maine

References

Maine Streamflow Data from the USGS
Maine Watershed Data From Environmental Protection Agency

Rivers of Kennebec County, Maine
Rivers of Lincoln County, Maine
Rivers of Waldo County, Maine
Rivers of Maine